Stella Wolfe Murray (7 October 1886 – August 1935) was a British journalist and writer. In 1924 she became the first woman Lobby correspondent.

Biography 
Stella Wolfe Murray reported for the Daily Sketch, ran her own women’s 'News and Views' column  that featured in the Leeds Mercury and also wrote 'Women’s Topics' for the Sheffield Independent. Murray became Lobby correspondent for the Leeds Mercury in 1924. They announced her employment on Tuesday 2 December 1924, stating that “The Leeds Mercury has always taken a pride in stating fairly all points of view in public life”.

Murray was an enthusiastic air passenger who conceived of, cowrote and coedited Woman and Flying. Woman and Flying was written with aviator Lady Mary Heath who was the first person to fly from Cape Town to London. In April 1924 the International Commission for Air Navigation passed a regulation banning women from operating commercial aircraft. Lady Heath worked with Stella Wolfe Murray to challenge the resolution, which was detailed in their book. In the summer of 1926 the regulation was rescinded. Murray also wrote The Poetry of Flight: An Anthology  as well as other articles relating to flying. She was the only Press Correspondent on the first Imperial Airways flight to Egypt.

In her newspaper columns Murray covered topics from stove-top cooking, to the new Factories Act and equal pay. She specialised in serious news of women's professional and industrial activities, including articles on 'Sheffield’s one policewoman' to 'Yorkshire’s women engineers'. Murray reported on the reaction to MP Ellen Wilkinson's choice of a bright green dress for an early parliamentary appearance and reminded her readers that ‘it is the woman herself that matters rather than her covering’.

Stella Wolfe Murray was a member of the Women's Freedom League.

Family 
Stella Wolfe Murray was born on 7 October 1886 at Madras (now Chennai), India. She was the daughter of Francis D'Arcy Osborne Wolfe Murray and Frances Henrietta Morgan. Her Uncle was Lt General James Wolfe-Murray. She married newspaper editor Philip Francis Sulley on 3 January 1929 in London.

Selected works 
Emily Forster, Stella Wolfe Murray, A.C. Marshall, N.W. Fraser, Lloyd's ABC of Careers for Girls (London: 1922)

Stella Wolfe Murray, The Poetry of Flight: An Anthology (London: Heath Cranton Limited, 1925)

Stella Wolfe Murray, 'London to Cairo by Air' in Airways "The Only Air Travel Magazine" (Harrison and Sons, September 1926 to August 1927)

Lady Mary Heath and Stella Wolfe Murray, Woman and Flying (London: John Long 1929)

References

1886 births
1935 deaths
British women journalists
British journalists
British people in colonial India